, also known as , is a type of soft confectionery made of pounded glutinous rice and eaten in Okinawa Prefecture. Muchi means "rice cake" in the Okinawan language, sometimes called "Casa Muchi" from the fact that it is wrapped in the leaves of shell ginger. After the muchi is seasoned with brown sugar,
white sugar, purple yam and so on, it is wrapped and steamed.

In December, it is eaten as a lucky charm for the prayer of health and longevity. Also, from the end of January to early February of the Gregorian calendar is the coldest season in Okinawa, and it is called “Muchibisa” over this period in Okinawan. “Families will prepare Muchi together, making dozens of individual ones called Kassa Muchi, and may even make a huge one, called Chikara Muchi, and eat the big one together. The Muchi treats are tied up in string and hung from the ceiling as pretty decorations in the house."

The origin of the "Onimochi" is from a folktale of the main island of Okinawa. It was written about 800 years ago in “Kyuuyo”, which was compiled in the 18th century at the time of Nao Takashi reign. It states that a man who moved from Shuri city to Osato city was attacking humans and animals and became a demon known as an "oni". His younger sister was sorrowful and put iron nails in Muchi, which the man loved and fed. Then, she pushed away the brother, who was weakened, to the sea and killed him. From this Okinawan tale, it is also called “Onimochi” because Muchi was used to exterminate the oni.

See also
Mochi

References

Okinawan cuisine
Glutinous rice dishes
Japanese rice dishes
Japanese confectionery
Rice cakes